Bernise Alldis (born 8 December 1987) is an English kickboxer and mixed martial artist who has been professionally competing since 2003.

She is the former WMC World Lightweight Champion, ISKA Muay Thai Featherweight World Champion, the former IKF Lightweight Muay Thai World Champion, Muay Thai Grand Prix Featherweight World Champion, and the Enfusion Season 1 Coach's Tournament winner.

Alldis made her transition to mixed martial arts in 2017.

Martial arts career
In 2004, Alldis faced Julie Kitchen during Warriors III. Alldis won the match by unanimous decision.

Bernise Alldis fought Krista Fleming for the WFCA World title in 2007. Alldis lost a unanimous decision.

A year later, Alldis contested the fought Maria Verheijen for the WMC World Lightweight title. Alldis won the title by unanimous decision.

In 2010, Alldis contested the ISKA World K1 Lightweight title, against Luisella Maccione. She won by unanimous decision.

In that same year Bernise Alldis participated in the Enfusion Season 1 Coach's Tournament. She beat Eva Berben in the semi finals, and Titiana van Polanen Petel in the finals to become the tournament winner.

Alldis faced Séverine Guilpin during Romford Fight Night 2011 for the IKF World Lightweight title. Alldis won the title by unanimous decision.

Alldis was scheduled to defend her ISKA World title against Amel Dehby during Urban Boxing United 2012. Alldis lost a unanimous decision.

During Lion Fight 22 Alldis fought against Tiffany van Soest, for the Lion Fight Featherweight title. In the fourth round of the fight Alldis was badly cut, and the ringside doctor stopped the fight. Van Soeast won by TKO.

Alldis' next kickboxing bout came in 2016, when she fought Elna Nilsson, winning the fight by decision.

In November 2016 Alldis won a unanimous decision over Emily Wahby to become the WBC Muaythai World Featherweight champion.

Alldis faced Laura De Blas at Combat Fight Series 6 on November 6, 2021. She won the fight by unanimous decision.

Mixed martial arts career
Alldis made her professional debut in 2018, during Fusion FC 27, against Evelina Puidaitė. She won the fight by TKO. Her second pro fight was during Fusion FC 28 against Diana Tavares. She won the fight by TKO. Her third fight was against Ana Maria Pal, during Fusion FC 29. She likewise won the fight by TKO.

Championships and accomplishments
 World Full Contact Association
 WFCA World Championship
 World Muaythai Council
 WMC World Lightweight Championship
 International Sport Karate Association
 ISKA Muay Thai Featherweight World Championship
 Enfusion
 Enfusion Season 1 Coach's Tournament Winner
 International Kickboxing Federation
 IKF Lightweight Muay Thai World Championship
 Muay Thai Grand Prix
 MTGP Featherweight World Championship
 World Boxing Council Muaythai
 WBC Muaythai World Featherweight Championship

Muay thai record

|-  bgcolor="#CCFFCC"
| 2021-11-06 || Win||align=left| Laura De Blas || Combat Fight Series 6 || London, England || Decision (Unanimous) || 5 || 3:00
|-
|-  bgcolor="#CCFFCC"
| 2016-11-19 || Win||align=left| Emily Wahby || WBC Muaythai Copthorne || Copthorne, West Sussex, England || Decision (Unanimous) || 5 || 3:00
|-
! style=background:white colspan=9 |
|-
|-  bgcolor="#CCFFCC"
| 2016-10-15|| Win||align=left| Elna Nilsson || Muay Thai Grand Prix 6 || London, England || Decision (Unanimous) || 5 || 3:00
|-
! style=background:white colspan=9 |
|-
|-  bgcolor="#CCFFCC"
| 2016-06-11 || Win||align=left| Anaëlle Angerville || Muay Thai Grand Prix 5 || London, England || Decision (Unanimous) || 3 || 3:00
|-
|-  bgcolor="#FFBBBB"
| 2015-05-22 || Loss||align=left| Tiffany van Soest || Lion Fight 22 || Henderson, Nevada, United States || TKO (Stoppage due to cut) || 4 || 1:44
|-
! style=background:white colspan=9 |
|-
|-  bgcolor="#CCFFCC"
| 2015-03-21 || Win||align=left| Tanya Merrett || Yokkao 13 || Bolton, England || Decision (Unanimous) || 3 || 3:00
|-
|-  bgcolor="#FFBBBB"
| 2012-05-19 || Loss||align=left| Amel Dehby || Urban Boxing United 2012 || Marseille, France || Decision (Unanimous) || 5 || 2:00
|-
! style=background:white colspan=9 |
|-
|-  bgcolor="#CCFFCC"
| 2011-03-19 || Win||align=left| Séverine Guilpin || Romford Fight Night 2011 || Essex, England || Decision (Unanimous) || 5 || 2:00
|-
! style=background:white colspan=9 |
|-
|-  bgcolor="#CCFFCC"
| 2010-07-09 || Win||align=left| Titiana van Polanen Petel || Enfusion Season 1 Coach's Tournament || Lisbon, Portugal || Decision (Unanimous) || 3 || 3:00
|-
|-  bgcolor="#CCFFCC"
| 2010-07-09 || Win||align=left| Eva Berben || Enfusion Season 1 Coach's Tournament || Lisbon, Portugal || Decision (Unanimous) || 3 || 3:00
|-
|-  bgcolor="#FFBBBB"
| 2010-05-29 || Loss||align=left| Anna Zucchelli || ExCel || London, England || Decision (Unanimous) || 5 || 2:00
|-
|-  bgcolor="#CCFFCC"
| 2010-03-13 || Win||align=left| Luisella Maccione || Kombat League || Essex, England || Decision (Unanimous) || 3 || 3:00
|-
! style=background:white colspan=9 |
|-
|-  bgcolor="#CCFFCC"
| 2009-12-05 || Win||align=left| Lisanne Van Der Molen || Muay Thai Legends || Croydon, England || Decision (Unanimous) || 5 || 2:00
|-
|-  bgcolor="#CCFFCC"
| 2009-05-24 || Win||align=left| Nathalie Visschers || Pain and Glory || London, England || Decision (Unanimous) || 3 || 3:00
|-
|-  bgcolor="#CCFFCC"
| 2008-11-23 || Win||align=left| Mikaela Mélante || Capital Punishment || London, England || Decision (Unanimous) || 3 || 3:00
|-
|-  bgcolor="#CCFFCC"
| 2008-08-16 || Win||align=left| Maria Verheijen || Muay Thai Legends || London, England || Decision (Unanimous) || 5 || 3:00
|-
! style=background:white colspan=9 |
|-
|-  bgcolor="#CCFFCC"
| 2008-04-26|| Win||align=left| Florence Delaroche || Pain and Glory || London, England || Decision (Unanimous) || 3 || 3:00
|-
|-  bgcolor="#FFBBBB"
| 2007-11-11 || Loss||align=left| Krista Fleming || Ax Kickboxing || Arnhem, Netherlands || Decision (Unanimous) || 5 || 3:00
|-
! style=background:white colspan=9 |
|-
|-  bgcolor="#CCFFCC"
| 2007-10 -07|| Win||align=left| Satya Maes || Warriors IX || Crawley, England || Decision (Unanimous) || 3 || 3:00
|-
|-  bgcolor="#CCFFCC"
| 2007-04-28 || Win||align=left| Laura Craig || Gatwick || London, England || Decision (Unanimous) || 5 || 2:00
|-
|-  bgcolor="#CCFFCC"
| 2004-10-03 || Win||align=left| Julie Kitchen || Warriors III || Crawley, England || Decision (Unanimous) || 5 || 2:00
|-
|-  bgcolor="#CCFFCC"
| 2004-08 || Win||align=left| Alena Holá || Women of Kickboxing || London, England || Decision (Unanimous) || 5 || 2:00
|-
! style=background:white colspan=9 |
|-
|-  bgcolor="#CCFFCC"
| 2004-06-06 || Win||align=left| Michelle Kellis || A Night in Bangkok II || Plymouth, England || Decision (Unanimous) || 5 || 2:00
|-
|-  bgcolor="#CCFFCC"
| 2004-02 || Win||align=left| Katie Proctor ||  || London, England || Decision || 5 || 2:00
|-
! style=background:white colspan=9 |
|-
|-  bgcolor="#CCFFCC"
| 2003-08-23 || Win||align=left| Tanya Dady ||  || London, England || TKO (Retirement) || 2 || 2:00
|-
|-  bgcolor="#CCFFCC"
| 2003-06-01 || Win||align=left| Lisa Beeley ||  || Guildford, England || Decision || 3 || 2:00
|-
|-  bgcolor="#CCFFCC"
| 2003-03-26 || Win||align=left| Katie Proctor || Time for Deliverance || London, England || Decision || 3 || 2:00
|-
|-  bgcolor="#CCFFCC"
| 2003 || Win||align=left| Rosie Hayward ||  || Crawley, England || Decision || 3 || 2:00
|-
! style=background:white colspan=9 |
|-
|-  bgcolor="#CCFFCC"
| 2003 || Win||align=left| Karen Lynch ||  || England || Decision || 3 || 2:00
|-
|-  bgcolor="#CCFFCC"
| 2002 || Win||align=left| Layla Ferdum ||  || England || Decision || 3 || 2:00
|-
| colspan=9 | Legend:

Mixed martial arts record

|-
|Win
|align=center|3–0
|Ana Maria Pal
|TKO (Punches)
|Fusion FC 29
|
|align=center|1
|align=center|2:54
|Surrey, England
|
|-
|Win
|align=center|2–0
|Diana Tavares
|TKO (Punches)
|Fusion FC 28
|
|align=center|1
|align=center|2:31
|Surrey, England
|
|-
|Win
|align=center|1–0
|Evelina Puidaitė
|TKO (Punches)
|Fusion FC 27
|
|align=center|2
|align=center|2:18
|Surrey, England
|
|-
|}

Amateur mixed martial arts record

|-
|Win
|align=center| 2–0
|Megan Norman
|TKO (Punches)
|Fusion FC 25
|
|align=center|1
|align=center|0:27
|Surrey, England
|
|-
|Win
|align=center| 1–0
|Indy Lynn
|TKO (Punches)
|Fusion FC 24
|
|align=center|2
|align=center|2:12
|Surrey, England
|
|-
|}

See also
 List of female kickboxers

References

External links
 Bernise Alldis at Awakening Fighters

Living people
English female mixed martial artists
Flyweight mixed martial artists
1987 births
English female kickboxers
Strawweight mixed martial artists
Mixed martial artists utilizing Muay Thai
Bantamweight kickboxers
English Muay Thai practitioners
Female Muay Thai practitioners